All Saints' Church, is a Grade I listed parish church in the Church of England in Babworth, Nottinghamshire.

History
The church was built in the 15th century, and restored in 1860 and 1878. It is a small structure with a tower steeple with three old bells, (to which were added three newly cast bells in the late 1950s) and a clock, a nave, chancel and a porch. Most of the building dates from the 15th century, with several 18th century memorials and 19th century stained glass by Charles Eamer Kempe. The chancel and sanctuary contain furniture by Robert (Mousey) Thompson, featuring his trademark mouse carvings. In early spring the church is surrounded by a spectacular display of snowdrops, which the public is free to visit.

According to Piercy, in 1295 the advowson of Babworth church was the property of Robert de Swillington, "who had free warren in Babworth". In 1365 after Swillington's death, it became the property of Sir Thomas de Grendon, who sold it to Sir William Trussbutt. Trussbutt is said to have presented it to the priory of Newstead, having first obtained the king's licence, and the licence of Sir Thomas de Saundby to do so. Newstead priory remained in possession of the church until 1531, until the prior of Newstead, John Blake, granted it and one acre of land to John Hercy, Esq. of Grove for the sum of fifteen pounds. In 1674 it became the property of the Wortleys, from whom it was purchased by John Simpson, Esq.

Piercy describes the church favourably as "a small but handsome structure of stone, advantageously situated on a rising ground. It consists of tower steeple, with three bells, and clock, a nave and chancel uniform in their windows, height, and battlements, with a side aisle and vestry, and a handsome porch. The whole is of the later period of the Gothic architecture. The little burial plot which surrounds it, is considerably elevated, being connected with, or rather enclosed within the elegant pleasure grounds of the adjacent buildings; while the fine trees, aged and bowery, enhance materially the charming effect of the ivy-mantled tower."

The congregation became Separatist on 11 July  1586 when Rev Richard Clyfton became Minister. He was deprived of his living in 1604. William Brewster and William Bradford, worshipped here until the Separatist Church was formed at Scrooby in 1606 when they and Clyfton moved there. Brewster and Bradford were both passengers aboard the Mayflower. Clyfton escaped to Amsterdam in 1608 and died there on 20 May 1616. A street in New Plymouth Massachusetts is named after him.

Group of Churches 
The Babworth Group of Churches is made up of three churches:
All Saints, Babworth
St Martin's, Ranby
St John's, Scofton with Osberton

Clergy 
The present Team Vicar is The Rev Dr Vasey-Saunders.
Previous Clergy:
Rev Robert Smith
Rev Charles Wasteneys Eyre MA 1830 Rector (Dispensation)
Rev John Eyre MA, BA 1830 Rector 
Rev John Twells BA Licensed 18 July 1830 Curate

See also
Grade I listed buildings in Nottinghamshire
Listed buildings in Babworth

References

Church of England church buildings in Nottinghamshire
Babworth
Babworth
Bassetlaw District